International Revelation Congress (IRC) is a Limpopo-based South African political party formed in 2013.

The party merged with Agang to contest the 2014 general election. After the problems in that party, it contested the 2016 municipal elections, aiming to rescue the Thulamela Local Municipality (where it finished seventh, winning one seat), and govern with traditional leaders.

The party is socially conservative, is against same-sex marriage and in favour of the right to administer corporal discipline to children. It is against land expropriation without compensation, and wants to replace Black Economic Empowerment with economic empowerment based on poverty rather than race.

The party contested the 2019 general election, failing to win any seats.

Election results

National elections

|-
! Election
! Total votes
! Share of vote
! Seats 
! +/–
! Government
|-
! 2019
| 4,247
| 0.02%
| 
| –
| 
|}

Provincial elections

! rowspan=2 | Election
! colspan=2 | Eastern Cape
! colspan=2 | Free State
! colspan=2 | Gauteng
! colspan=2 | Kwazulu-Natal
! colspan=2 | Limpopo
! colspan=2 | Mpumalanga
! colspan=2 | North-West
! colspan=2 | Northern Cape
! colspan=2 | Western Cape
|-
! % !! Seats
! % !! Seats
! % !! Seats
! % !! Seats
! % !! Seats
! % !! Seats
! % !! Seats
! % !! Seats
! % !! Seats
|-
! 2019
| 0.02% || 0/63
| - || -
| 0.02% || 0/73
| - || -
| 0.12% || 0/49
| 0.04% || 0/30
| 0.03% || 0/33
| 0.03% || 0/30
| - || -
|}

Municipal elections

|-
! Election
! Votes
! %
|-
! 2016
| 4,834
| 0.01%
|-
! 2021
| 10,936
| 0.04%
|-
|}

References

2013 establishments in South Africa
Conservative parties in South Africa
Political parties established in 2013
Political parties in South Africa
Social conservative parties